Mohammadi is a town and a municipal board in Lakhimpur Kheri district in the Indian state of Uttar Pradesh. The town and nearby area is known for sugarcane farming. Mohammadi is also known for a special kind of flower known as ‘Ketki Flower’. The fragrance from this flower, only available in Mohammadi, spreads in the whole bagh and nearby areas.

Politicians

Rekha verma is the member of parliament since 2014, she won the election from 80 Dhaurara lok sabha, on the ticket of bhartiyaa janta party.

Lokendra Pratap Singh, is a lawyer by profession and also an active member of bhartiya janta party, he contested in 2017 general assembly elections from 144 Vidhan Sabha, uttar Pradesh,  and he won his seat on the ticket of Bhartiya janta party.

Demographics

As of the 2001 Census of India, Mohammadi had a population of 38,427. Males constitute 53% of the population and females 47%. Mohammadi has an average literacy rate of 48%, lower than the national average of 59.5%: male literacy is 53%, and female literacy is 43%. In Mohammadi, 16% of the population is under 6 years of age.

Tourism 
Tourist places include Shri Hanuman Mandir, Tedhenath Shiv Mandir, Grand Jama Masjid and a Gurudwara, Jangali Nath Shiv mandir..

Education 
Mohammadi has two degree colleges for getting higher education, named Ganna Kisan Mahavidyalaya and Mohammadi Mahavidyalaya. Some local inter colleges are (1) J P Inter College (2) P D Inter College (3) R P Inter College (4) Doon Public School and (5) Yugnirman Kanya Vidyalaya.

References 

Cities and towns in Lakhimpur Kheri district